Lisa Bayliss-Pratt is a nurse who now directs and leads medical education for nurses and ancillary staff in England.  She was appointed the Chief Nurse of Health Education England in 2012, where her projects included Raising the Bar to improve nursing education; introduction of the Nursing Associate role; and the Return to Practice programme to encourage experienced staff to return to nursing.  Her other roles and responsibilities have included being the Interim Regional Director for London and South East in 2017 and a secondment to Coventry University in 2019 as acting pro-vice-chancellor. .    

Mark Radford from NHS England and Improvement was appointed on an interim basis in 2019 and then in the permanent role in April 2020.

References 
 

Academics of Coventry University
Alumni of Coventry University
Educational administrators
British nurses
Living people
Year of birth missing (living people)